Garfield Township is one of seventeen townships in Grundy County, Illinois, USA.  As of the 2010 census, its population was 1,586 and it contained 673 housing units.

History
Garfield township was formed from Greenfield township on March 10, 1903. The area contained coal mines.

Geography

Cities, towns, villages
 Gardner (vast majority)

Cemeteries
The township contains Grand Prairie Lutheran Cemetery.

Major highways
  Interstate 55
  Illinois Route 53

Demographics

School districts
 Herscher Community Unit School District 2

Political districts
 Illinois' 11th congressional district
 State House District 75
 State Senate District 38

References
 
 United States Census Bureau 2007 TIGER/Line Shapefiles
 United States National Atlas

External links
 City-Data.com
 Illinois State Archives

Townships in Grundy County, Illinois
Townships in Illinois
1903 establishments in Illinois